The 2020–21 BSC Fehérvár FC season was the club's 80th season in existence and the 22nd consecutive season in the top flight of Hungarian football. In addition to the domestic league, Fehérvár participated in this season's editions of the Hungarian Cup and the UEFA Europa League. The season covers the period from 1 July 2020 to 30 June 2021.

Players

First-team squad

Transfers

In

Out

Loan out

Pre-season and friendlies

Competitions

Overview

Nemzeti Bajnokság I

League table

Results summary

Results by round

Matches

Hungarian Cup

UEFA Europa League

Statistics

Appearances and goals
Last updated on 9 May 2021.

|-
|colspan="14"|Youth players:

|-
|colspan="14"|Out to loan:

|-
|colspan="14"|Players no longer at the club:

|}

Top scorers
Includes all competitive matches. The list is sorted by shirt number when total goals are equal.
Last updated on 9 May 2021

Disciplinary record
Includes all competitive matches. Players with 1 card or more included only.

Last updated on 9 May 2021

Overall
{|class="wikitable"
|-
|Games played || 44 (33 OTP Bank Liga, 4 UEFA Europa League and 7 Hungarian Cup)
|-
|Games won || 23 (16 OTP Bank Liga, 1 UEFA Europa League and 6 Hungarian Cup)
|-
|Games drawn || 10 (8 OTP Bank Liga, 2 UEFA Europa League and 0 Hungarian Cup)
|-
|Games lost || 11 (9 OTP Bank Liga, 1 UEFA Europa League and 1 Hungarian Cup)
|-
|Goals scored || 88
|-
|Goals conceded || 47
|-
|Goal difference || +41
|-
|Yellow cards || 86
|-
|Red cards || 5
|-
|rowspan="1"|Worst discipline ||  Attila Fiola (12 , 1 )
|-
|rowspan="2"|Best result || 5–0 (A) v Tiszaföldvár - Hungarian Cup - 20-9-2020
|-
| 5–0 (A) v Újpest - Nemzeti Bajnokság I - 23-1-2021
|-
|rowspan="3"|Worst result || 1–3 (A) v Standard Liège - UEFA Europa League - 1-10-2020
|-
| 1–3 (A) v MTK Budapest - Nemzeti Bajnokság I - 7-11-2020
|-
| 1–3 (H) v Diósgyőr - Nemzeti Bajnokság I - 20-2-2021
|-
|rowspan="1"|Most appearances ||  Ivan Petryak (42 appearances)
|-
|rowspan="1"|Top scorer ||  Nemanja Nikolić (22 goals)
|-
|Points || 79/132 (59.84%)
|-

References

External links 

Fehérvár FC seasons
Fehervar FC
Fehervar FC